The East-West Pipeline, also known as the Petroline, is a -long  pipeline that runs from the Abqaiq oil field in the Eastern Province (near Bahrain and Qatar on the Persian Gulf coast) across the width of the Arabian Peninsula to the Red Sea. It was built during the Iran-Iraq war. The line was converted to carry natural gas, but was converted back to carry crude oil. The pipeline is actually twinned pipes, and as of 2018 had a capacity of 5 million BPD.

History

The pipeline was built in the 1980s, "amid fears that the Iran-Iraq war would cut off shipping through the Strait of Hormuz."

The 2019 East–West Pipeline attack was a Houthi drone attack that targeted the Pipeline on 14 May 2019. The attack temporarily shut down the pipeline before it was reopened.

References 

Oil pipelines in Saudi Arabia